Sajan Re Phir Jhoot Mat Bolo (SRPJMB) (English: "Honey do not lie again") is an Indian sitcom that was broadcast on SAB TV from 23 May 2017 to 14 September 2018. It is the sequel to Sajan Re Jhoot Mat Bolo, and stars Hussain Kuwajerwala, Parvati Vaze, Tiku Talsania, and Sharad Ponkshe. Reruns were broadcast on Sony Pal from 18 June 2018 onwards. The show ended on 14 September 2018 after completing 340 episodes.

Plot
Jaiveer Chopra is a wealthy man who falls in love with a girl named Jaya Lokhande in college. He lies to her and says that he is poor. After college, both go to their parents. Jai has a welcome party for Jaya. Meanwhile, at Jaya's house, Jai learns that her father, Lalit Rao Lokhande abhors the rich. He devises a ruse to pretend to be poor and convinces others to pretend to be his family. Jai constructs a fake poor house beside his mansion with different doors to enter from one house to another.

Jai's married life is frequently troubled by Sudhakar and Jaya's attempts to get a job in Jai's company as a doctor. Jaya spies on Jai after she overhears a conversation between Jai and Kangana Kalia about hiding the family's rich secrets in front of Lokhande and Jaya. Jaya disguises herself as a maid in the Chopra mansion and learns about Jai's wealth, but Jai exposes her. Jaya slips on the stairs, and loses part of her memory, remembering only the events up to year 2012

Lokhande brings her back to Jai's house and lies to Jaya, saying that she is still in the year 2012. Jaya begins to develop feelings towards Jai but still feels he is not the right choice for her. Although Jai tries to please her like before, Jaya is still unwilling to marry Jai because she doubts him and his family. When Jaya agrees to marry Jaiveer, the plan flops as Gyanchand/Deepak mistakenly sets the wedding date in 2018.

The plot moves forward with Jai and Jaya sharing a few romantic moments, but Lokhande learns that Jai and his family are rich. Jai finds out that the real Lokhande has been kidnapped and the plotter who discovered the truth is an imposter. Meanwhile, Lokhande suffers from a sleep-related condition that the Chopras assume him to be dead.

Jaya finds out that Jai is lying with Deepak, and she tries to call the police and get Jai arrested. Lokhande, unable to tolerate Jaya's rudeness and arrogance towards Jai, gets infuriated and confesses that Jai is her husband and she is suffering from memory loss.

In an attempt to revive her memory, Jai decorates his room with all the precious moments of their journey of love and marriage. Jaya apologises to Jai, and he forgives her.

Cast

Main
Hussain Kuwajerwala as Jay Chopra who is a wealthy man but pretends to be poor in front of Jaya. 
Parvati Vaze as Jaya Lokhande Chopra who is a poor girl but has fallen with wealthy Jay.

Recurring
Sharad Ponkshe as Lalit Rao Lokhande Jaya's strict father and Jay's strict father-in-law.
Tiku Talsania as Paramveer Chopra "PC"/Premchand Chopra. Jay's father and innocent by nature and rich by wealth.
Rakhi Vijan as Monica Malpani. Jay's fake mother an PC's best friend.
Gaurav Dubey as Deepak Tijori. Jay,s Best Friend and Sage Gyanchand Ji in front of Lokhande's family 
Urmila Tiwari as Urmila Bhide/Urmila Chopra Jay's fake sister but Jay treats her as her own real sister.
Priya Raina as Kangana Kalia. Vodka Queen and Jay's fake Grandma
Amish Tanna as Sudhakar Panchikar. A spy guy of Lokhande
Shruti Rawat as Jimnaak Jhimkari aka Jingalala. Sudhakar innocent wife and she keeps speaking something which nobody can understand (Junglee language)
Deepali Saini as Sajni. Deepak's GirlFriend
Lavleen Raizada as Maria. A beautiful chef of PC
Sonal Bhatt as Sushma Lalit Rao. Deepak"s love interest and crush
 Vrajesh Hirjee as Drama Director 
 Purvesh Pimple as Tatya
 Dipika Kakar as an actress herself (Episodic appearance) 
 Dushyant Wagh as Triyambak
 Sharat Saxena as Kulguru Trikaldarshi
 V.I.P. as Kabila King
 Dheeraj Miglani as Sadashiv
 Anamika Singh as Pinky
 Deepak Pareek as Commissioner Mugal Mukherjee
 Prasad Barve as Inspector Karan
 Kushal Punjabi as Kundan Panwar
 Nitin Vakharia as Chandan Panwar (Kundan's father)
 Abhay Pratap Singh as Vijay, Jai's fake brother and a thief
 Silambarasan T R as Thillu Mullu Editor
 Gopichand as Director
 Prabhas as Producer
 Lollu Sabha Jeeva as Actor

Nominations

 Hussain Kuwajerwala – Jaiveer Chopra – Popular Star Male 2018 (nominated)

References

2017 Indian television series debuts
Indian comedy television series
Sony SAB original programming
Television series by Optimystix Entertainment
Television shows set in Mumbai